The Lechon Festival  (English: Parade of Roast Pigs; Filipino: Parada ng Lechon) is a religious and cultural festival in Balayan, Batangas, Philippines held every June 24. The festival is celebrated in honor of St. John the Baptist. Numerous activities are performed such as lechon parade, and water dousing.

References 

Christian festivals in the Philippines
[[Category:Culture of Batangas]
Lechon festival is in Batangas of Philippines